Enkhbatyn Lkhagvasüren (born 10 August 1988) is a Mongolian table tennis player. He competed in the 2020 Summer Olympics. He is four time champion of Mongolia in a single event

References

External links
 

1988 births
Living people
Sportspeople from Ulaanbaatar
Table tennis players at the 2020 Summer Olympics
Olympic table tennis players of Mongolia
Mongolian male table tennis players
Asian Games competitors for Mongolia
Table tennis players at the 2002 Asian Games
Table tennis players at the 2014 Asian Games
Table tennis players at the 2018 Asian Games
21st-century Mongolian people